Michael Stuart Solwold (born September 30, 1977) is a former American football long snapper and tight end in the National Football League (NFL) for the Dallas Cowboys, Minnesota Vikings, Tampa Bay Buccaneers, Baltimore Ravens, and New England Patriots. He played college football at the University of Wisconsin.

Early years
Solwold attended Arrowhead High School, where he was named an All-American, All-State, All-Region and All-Conference at tight end, while receiving the 1995-1996 Wisconsin Gatorade State Player of the year award as a senior.

He contributed to his team winning two WIAA Division I state championships (1993 and 1994). He also was a three-year starter in basketball.

College career
Solwold accepted a football scholarship from the University of Wisconsin. As a freshman, he took over long snapper Mike Schneck, who injured his wrist while celebrating Matt Davenport's game-winning field goal against Indiana University.

In 1999, he became the team's long snapper as a junior and was a part of two Big Ten Conference Championships and two Rose Bowl wins.

Professional career

Minnesota Vikings
Solwold was signed as an undrafted free agent by the Minnesota Vikings after the 2001 NFL Draft on April 23. He was waived on August 27.

Dallas Cowboys
On August 30, 2001, Solwold was claimed off waivers by the Dallas Cowboys, who were looking to replace long snapper Dale Hellestrae who was released in a salary-cap move. On September 4, the Cowboys claimed long snapper Randy Chevrier and cut Solwold. On November 14, he was re-signed after Chevrier struggled for three games. He was released on April 18, 2002.

Tampa Bay Buccaneers
On May 3, 2002, he was signed as a free agent by the Tampa Bay Buccaneers. He suffered a broken left foot in the fourth game against the Cincinnati Bengals. He was placed on the injured reserve list on October 1. He wasn't re-signed after the season.

Baltimore Ravens
On June 9, 2003, Solwold signed with the Baltimore Ravens as a free agent, to compete against starter Joe Maese. He was cut on August 30 and signed to the practice squad two days later. He was promoted to the active roster on December 11 and was declared inactive for the last 3 games, to avoid losing him to the New England Patriots. In 2004, he was cut on the first day of training camp, after recovering from a torn chest muscle that he suffered in the first minicamp. On December 12, he was signed to replace an injured Maese.

New England Patriots
On January 12, 2005, he was signed by the New England Patriots to the practice squad for the playoffs. He wasn't re-signed after the season.

References

External links
 2015 Arrowhead Athletic Hall of Fame Inductees

1977 births
Living people
People from Menomonee Falls, Wisconsin
Sportspeople from the Milwaukee metropolitan area
Players of American football from Wisconsin
American football tight ends
American football long snappers
Wisconsin Badgers football players
Minnesota Vikings players
Dallas Cowboys players
Tampa Bay Buccaneers players
Baltimore Ravens players
New England Patriots players